Robert Scott VC (4 June 1874 – 21 February 1961), was an English recipient of the Victoria Cross, the highest and most prestigious award for gallantry in the face of the enemy that can be awarded to British and Commonwealth forces.

Details
Born in Haslingden, Lancashire, he was a 25-year-old private in the 1st Battalion, Manchester Regiment, British Army during the Second Boer War when the following deed took place in Natal for which he and Private James Pitts were awarded the VC:

The medal
His Victoria Cross is displayed at the Museum of the Manchester Regiment, Ashton-under-Lyne, England.

References

Irish Winners of the Victoria Cross (Richard Doherty & David Truesdale, 2000)
Monuments to Courage (David Harvey, 1999)
The Register of the Victoria Cross (This England, 1997)
Victoria Crosses of the Anglo-Boer War (Ian Uys, 2000)

External links
Location of grave and VC medal (Co. Down, Northern Ireland)
Angloboerwar.com

1874 births
1961 deaths
Military personnel from Lancashire
People from Haslingden
Second Boer War recipients of the Victoria Cross
Manchester Regiment soldiers
British Army personnel of the Second Boer War
Royal Air Force personnel of World War II
British recipients of the Victoria Cross
Royal Ulster Constabulary officers
British Army personnel of World War I
British Army recipients of the Victoria Cross